Shine is the second album released by the classical crossover string quartet Bond. It peaked at No. 26 on the UK Albums Chart, and went Gold in six countries. While it peaked at No. 61 on the US Billboard 200 albums chart, it spent five consecutive weeks at No. 1 on the Classical Crossover charts. Bond described the album as having "slightly more ethnic undertones" than their first album.

Track listing

Charts

References

2002 albums
Bond (band) albums
Decca Records albums